The name Mount Welcome or Mt Welcome, may refer to several geographical places.

Mountains/hills
 The original name of Mount Sir Mackenzie Bowell, British Columbia.
 A hill overlooking the town of Roebourne, Western Australia, which also gave its name to:
 Mount Welcome Station a pastoral lease and homestead (Mount Welcome House), established in 1864.
Mount Welcome (Queensland), a peak in the Flinders Peak Group in Queensland, Australia.
 A peak in the Usarp Mountains of Antarctica.

Other places
 Mount Welcome Estate, an area of Christiansted, on the island of St. Croix, United States Virgin Islands.
 Mount Welcome: a historic residence in Lincoln County, North Carolina, which is listed by the US National Register of Historic Places